Bülent Bölükbaşı (born 17 June 1976) is a former Turkish footballer.

Career
He started and finished his professional career at the club of his place of birth; Adanaspor. He became a Turkey international footballer on 31 March 2004 against Croatia. That was his first and last international cap.

In 2012 he started his coaching career at Adanaspor taking the role of youth coach. In 2016 he took his first job as a manager at Gaziantep Büyükşehir Belediyespor. End 2019 he was given the role of Director of football at his former club Kayserispor, which he also captained as a player.

References

1976 births
Living people
Turkish footballers
Turkey B international footballers
Adanaspor footballers
Konyaspor footballers
Gaziantepspor footballers
Diyarbakırspor footballers
Kayserispor footballers
Kocaelispor footballers
Ankaraspor footballers
Süper Lig players
Turkey international footballers

Association football midfielders